Sirens is the fifth album by pop-folk duo The Weepies. It was released in 2015, their first album in five years, by Nettwerk. It was recorded in 2014 during Deb Talan's battle with breast cancer.

Track listing
All songs written by Deb Talan and Steve Tannen, except where noted.

Personnel
Deb Talan - vocals, piano, synthesizer, mellotron, keyboards, guitar, ukulele, tines, percussion, programming
Steve Tannen - vocals, guitar, piano, keyboards, percussion, programming
Jon Flaugher – bass
Frank Lenz – drums, percussion, tines, background vocals
Gerry Leonard – guitar
Pete Thomas – drums, percussion
Rami Jaffee – organ, omnichord, keyboards
Oliver Kraus - strings
Matt Chamberlain – drums, percussion
Eli Thomson – bass
Steve Nieve – piano
Tony Levin – bass
Sebastian Steinberg – bass
Whynot Jansveld – bass, keyboards
Meg Toohey – guitar
Brad Gordon – piano
Phil Chen – banjo
Vartan Babayan – percussion
Andrew Baham – trumpet
Stephen Lands – trumpet
Rex Gregory – alto saxophone
Roderick Paulin – tenor saxophone
Michael Watson – trombone

References

External links
The Weepies Official Home Page

2015 albums
The Weepies albums